Ihar Uladzimiravich Patapaw (Igor Vladimirovich Potapov; born 29 December 1966) is a Belarusian football coach and a former player. He works as a goalkeepers' coach with Minsk.

He played one game as a field player for FC Zarya Leninsk-Kuznetsky.

Honours
Dvina Vitebsk
Belarusian Premier League runner-up: 1992–93 (as KIM Vitebsk), 1994–95
Belarusian Premier League bronze: 1993–94 (as KIM Vitebsk)

References

1966 births
Living people
Soviet footballers
FC Vitebsk players
Belarusian footballers
FC Chernomorets Novorossiysk players
Russian Premier League players
Belarusian expatriate footballers
Expatriate footballers in Russia
FC Naftan Novopolotsk players
Association football goalkeepers